Wendy Davies or Davis may refer to:

 Wendy Davis (actress) (born 1966), American actress
 Wendy Davis (politician) (born 1963), American politician
 Wendy Davis (rugby union), rugby union player who represented Wales
 Dame Wendy Davies, British headteacher (Selly Park Technology College for Girls; see List of Dames Commander of the Order of the British Empire (2001)) 
Wendy Davies, OBE, professor of history